Öztürk Karataş (born 15 February 1991, in Kağızman) is a Turkish footballer who plays for SV Kirchdorf/Iller.

Club career
On 8 May 2010 Karataş had his debut for VfB Stuttgart II in the 3. Liga against FC Carl Zeiss Jena.

International career
He played for Turkey at the 2008 European Under-17 Championship.

References

External links
Profile at VfB-Stuttgart.de 
Profile at kicker.de 
Öztürk Karataş at Fupa

1991 births
Living people
Turkish footballers
VfB Stuttgart II players
3. Liga players
Association football midfielders
Turkey youth international footballers
People from Kağızman